Phalaborwa (translated to English as better than the south; phala means better than and borwa means south) is a town in the Mopani District Municipality, Limpopo province, South Africa.

Name
The name "Ba-Phalaborwa" was given to the area by the Sotho tribes who moved there from the south. It means "better than the south".

History 
The Sotho mined and smelted copper and iron ore there by 400 AD.

Geography
It is located near the confluence of the Ga-Selati River and the Olifants, halfway up along the western border of the Kruger National Park in the Lowveld.

It is the only town in South Africa that borders Kruger National Park. The border with Mozambique is two hours away. Various private game reserves nearly surround Phalaborwa. Hans Merensky Golf Estate is situated on the outskirts.

Nearby natural attractions are Blyde River Canyon, the Three Rondavels, God's Window and Bourke's Luck Potholes; the Tzaneen fruit farms and Hoedspruit game farms can all be visited within a day.

Masorini, near Phalaborwa gate, is a reconstructed Ba-Phalaborwa hill village, with huts, grain storage areas, and an iron smelting site.

Two townships, Namakgale and Lulekani are where the Pedi and Tsonga reside. Rural areas such as Mashishimale, Humulani,  Kurhula (Matshama Hi Nkano), Ben Farm (Majeje), Makushane and Ga-Maseke.Ga-selwane.majeje 3 and prieska are there.

Economy

Mining 
Phalaborwa is home to Palabora Mining.  The massive open pit mine, nearly 2,000 meters across, is Africa's widest manmade hole.

Tourism 
Tourism and wildlife play a dominant role in the economy.

Transport
Phalaborwa Airport is a commercial airport serving the town.

Notable people
Tshepo Mangena: cricketer
Rivoningo Mhlari: businessman 
Dale Steyn: South African cricketer
Daniel Mminele: South African banker and corporate executive
Ryan Coetzee: Swimmer who won a bronze medal at the 2018 Commonwealth Games
Ethy Mbhalati: Cricketer
Moca: Musician
Pule Mabe: Politician

Climate
This area is also known as the Valley of the Olifants. Rainfall is low. It has the highest winter temperature in South Africa, with an average winter temperature range from 9 °C to 26 °C.During summer the average temperatures vary from 20 °C to 33 °C with occasional heavy rainfall. The highest recorded temperature was 50 °C in December 2018.

References

External links
Phalaborwa Trade & Tourism
Phalaborwa: The Town Of Two Summers

Populated places in the Ba-Phalaborwa Local Municipality
Mining communities in South Africa